Eenie Meenie Records (stylized as eenie meenie records) is a Los Angeles–based independent record label.

Information
Eenie Meenie Records was founded in 1999 by Reiko Kondo and specializes in signing indie pop, indie rock and electronica artists. Notably, the label has also released albums from side bands of The Apples in Stereo members; 010 by Ulysses (Robert Schneider) and Songs About the Ocean by The High Water Marks (Hilarie Sidney).

In 2005, a CD entitled Dimension Mix was released as a tribute to electronic music pioneer Bruce Haack with the profits donated to Cure Autism Now.

Artists
Blue-Eyed Son
Division Day
DJ Me DJ You
Faraway Places
From Bubblegum to Sky
Goldenboy
Great Northern
The High Water Marks
Hockey Night
Irving
Old Monk
Oranger
Pine*AM
Scissors for Lefty
Seksu Roba
Space Needle
Troubled Hubble
Ulysses
Wallpaper

See also
 List of record labels

References

External links
Official Website

Record labels established in 1999
American independent record labels
Indie rock record labels
Indie pop record labels
Electronic music record labels
1999 establishments in California